Gerhard Buchwald (15 February 1920 – 19 July 2009) was a German medical doctor and vaccination critic from Eisenberg, Thuringia.

Buchwald studied medicine in Königsberg (now Kaliningrad), Danzig (Gdańsk), and Jena and obtained his doctorate at the University of Hamburg. From 1970 to 1982 he was senior physician at the Klinik Franken of the Bundesversicherungsanstalt für Angestellte in Bad Steben, and from 1982 to 1989 he was chief physician at the Klinik am Park in Bad Steben. He retired in 1990.

Publications
Impfen - Das Geschäft mit der Angst  (English version: Vaccination - A Business Based on Fear ) by Dr. med. G. Buchwald
The Vaccination Nonsense (2004 Lectures) - Dr. med. G. Buchwald   
The Decline of Tuberculosis despite "protective" Vaccination by Dr. Gerhard Buchwald M.D. 
Buchwald G. [See Related Articles] [Convulsive disease recognized by a court decision as a vaccination injury following smallpox vaccination]. Med Welt. 1967 Jun 17;24:1488-91. German. No abstract available.; UI: 69226516. 
Buchwald G. [See Related Articles] [Letter: Smallpox vaccination: more harm than benefit]. MMW Munch Med Wochenschr. 1975 Mar 7;117(10):411-2. German. No abstract available.; UI: 75138089. 
Buchwald G, et al.[Against compulsory smallpox vaccination]. Med Welt. 1972 May 13;23(20):758-60. German. No abstract available. ; UI: 72214698.

References

1920 births
2009 deaths
German anti-vaccination activists
Physicians from Thuringia
University of Hamburg alumni